In Greek mythology, Algea (Ancient Greek:  Algos) is used by Hesiod in the plural as the personification of pain, both physical and mental. They were the bringers of weeping and tears. Their Roman counterpart was Dolor.

Etymology 
Algos in Greek is a neuter noun literally meaning "pain". The name is related to the word suffix '-algia' denoting a painful condition.

Names 
The three known Algea are Lupe (Λύπη means 'pain'), Achos (Ἄχος means 'grief'), and Ania (Ἀνία means 'sorrow').

Alcman's account 
"Akhos (Distress) grips me, you destructive daimon."

Anacreon's account 
"Thanks to him (Dionysos) Methe (Drunkenness) was brought forth, the Kharis (Charis, Grace) was born, Lupa (Pain) takes rest and Ania (Grief) goes to sleep."

Family 

In Hesiod's Theogony, the Algea are represented as the children of Eris, the goddess of strife. They were siblings to Lethe, Limos, Horkos, Ponos and many other daemons.

 "And hateful Eris bore painful Ponos ("Hardship"),
 Lethe ("Forgetfulness") and Limos ("Starvation") and the tearful Algea ("Pains"),
 Hysminai ("Battles"), Makhai ("Wars"), Phonoi ("Murders"), and Androktasiai ("Manslaughters");
 Neikea ("Quarrels"), Pseudea ("Lies"), Logoi ("Stories"), Amphillogiai ("Disputes")
 Dysnomia ("Anarchy") and Ate ("Ruin"), near one another,
 and Horkos ("Oath"), who most afflicts men on earth,
 Then willing swears a false oath."

According to Hyginus, Dolor/Algos was the daughter of Aether and Terra (Earth).

Mythology

Infernal resident 
Algos (Dolor) was represented to be dwelling near the river Cocytus in Hades along with other spirits:"The foul pool of Cocytus' sluggish stream lies here;here the vulture, there the dole-bringing owl utters its cry,and the sad omen of the gruesome screech-owl sounds.The leaves shudder, black with gloomy foliagewhere sluggish Sopor/ Hypnos (Sleep) clings to the overhanging yew,where sad Fames/ Limos (Hunger) lies with wasted jaws,and Pudor/ Aedos (Shame), too late, hides her guilt-burdened face.Metus/ Deimos (Dread) stalks there, gloomy Pavor/ Phobos (Fear) and gnashing Dolor/ Algos (Pain),sable Luctus/ Penthus (Grief), tottering Morbus/ Nosos (Disease)and iron-girt Bella/ Enyo (War); and last of all slowSenectus/ Geras (Old Age) supports his steps upon a staff."

Malevolent daemons

Statius account 
The cursed necklace of Harmonia was crafted by Hephaistos (Vulcan) with the aid of malevolent daimones including Dolor/ Algos."None did mould it, but Luctus/ Penthos (Grief), and all the Irae/ Lyssai (Madnesses), and Dolor/ Algos (Anguish) and Discordia/ Eris (Discord), with all the craft of her right hand."

Seneca's account 
The ghost of Laios demands the expulsion of Oidipous from Thebes before he will recall the pestilent daimones including Dolor (Algos) that plaguing the land:"Wherefore speedily expel ye the king from out your borders, in exile drive him to any place so-ever with his baleful step. Let him leave the land; then, blooming with flowers of spring, shall it renew its verdure, the life-giving air shall give pure breath again, and their beauty shall come back to the woods; Letum/ Ker (Ruin) and Lues/ Nosos (Pestilence), Mors/ Thanatos (Death), Labor/ Ponos (Hardship), Tabes/ Phthisis (Corruption) and Dolor/ Algos (Distress), fit company for him, shall all depart together. And he himself with hastening steps shall long to flee our kingdom, but I will set wearisome delays before his feet and hold him back. He shall creep, uncertain of his way, with the staff of age groping out his gloomy way. Rob ye him of the earth; his father will take from him the sky."After blinding himself and heading into exile, Oidipous urges the pestilent daimones including Dolor (Algos) to leave Thebes:"All ye who are weary in body and burdened with disease, whose hearts are faint within you, see, I fly, I leave you; lift your heads. Milder skies come when I am gone. He who, though near to death, still keeps some feeble life, may freely now draw deep, life-giving draughts of air. Go, bear ye aid to those given up to death; all pestilential humours of the land I take with me. Ye blasting Fatae/ Keres (Fates), thou quaking terror of Morbus/ Nosos (Disease), Macies/ Ischnasia (Wasting), and black Pestis/ Nosos (Pestilence), and mad Dolor/ Algos (Despair), come ye with me, with me. 'Tis sweet to have such guides."

Notes

References 

 Gaius Julius Hyginus, Fabulae from The Myths of Hyginus translated and edited by Mary Grant. University of Kansas Publications in Humanistic Studies. Online version at the Topos Text Project.
Grimal, Pierre, The Dictionary of Classical Mythology, Wiley-Blackwell, 1996. 
 Hesiod, Theogony from The Homeric Hymns and Homerica with an English Translation by Hugh G. Evelyn-White, Cambridge, MA.,Harvard University Press; London, William Heinemann Ltd. 1914. Online version at the Perseus Digital Library. Greek text available from the same website.
Lucius Annaeus Seneca, Tragedies. Translated by Miller, Frank Justus. Loeb Classical Library Volumes. Cambridge, MA, Harvard University Press; London, William Heinemann Ltd. 1917. Hercules Furens: Online version at theio.com. Oedipus: Online version at theio.com.
Lucius Annaeus Seneca, Tragoediae. Rudolf Peiper. Gustav Richter. Leipzig. Teubner. 1921. Hercules Furens: Latin text available at the Perseus Digital Library. Oedipus: Latin text available at the Perseus Digital Library.
Publius Papinius Statius, The Thebaid translated by John Henry Mozley. Loeb Classical Library Volumes. Cambridge, MA, Harvard University Press; London, William Heinemann Ltd. 1928. Online version at the Topos Text Project.
Publius Papinius Statius, The Thebaid. Vol I-II. John Henry Mozley. London: William Heinemann; New York: G.P. Putnam's Sons. 1928. Latin text available at the Perseus Digital Library.

Greek goddesses
Personifications in Greek mythology
Children of Eris (mythology)
Pain